Russell Gage Jr. (born January 22, 1996) is an American football wide receiver for the Tampa Bay Buccaneers of the National Football League (NFL). He played college football at LSU, and was drafted by the Atlanta Falcons in the sixth round of the 2018 NFL Draft.

High school career
Gage attended and played high school football at Redemptorist High School.

College career
Gage attended and played college football at LSU from 2014–2017. He played defensive back for his first two seasons, but was brought onto the offense in Week 7 of his junior year for a key victory over #22 Texas A&M, where he led the run-heavy Tigers with five catches for 62 yards and a touchdown, his only receptions of the season. He was used as both a running back and receiver in his senior year, generating four touchdowns on just 49 touches. He also recorded 11 tackles as a special teams gunner.

Collegiate statistics

Professional career

Atlanta Falcons
With modest college stats, Gage was not invited to the combine any of the major award games, but attracted attention after an exceptional Pro Day and strong endorsement of his work ethic by coaches. Gage was drafted by the Atlanta Falcons in the sixth round with the 194th overall pick in the 2018 NFL Draft, four rounds behind fellow LSU wide receiver D. J. Chark. In Week 6, against the Tampa Bay Buccaneers, Gage recorded his first professional reception, which went for six yards. As a rookie, he totaled six receptions for 63 yards in 15 games on a team with deep talent at receiver.

In Week 13 of the 2019 season, Gage recorded his first professional receiving touchdown against the New Orleans Saints. Overall, Gage finished the 2019 season with 49 receptions for 446 receiving yards (fourth on the team behind Calvin Ridley, and pro-bowl-bound Julio Jones and Austin Hooper) and one receiving touchdown.

With Jones injured for seven games and the departure of Hooper, in 2020 Gage became the second leading receiver for the 4-12 Falcons. Gage's breakthrough game came in the home opener of September 13, a loss to the Seattle Seahawks where he had 114 receiving yards on nine receptions. In the following week's game against the Dallas Cowboys, Gage caught six passes for 46 yards and another touchdown during the 40–39 loss. In Week 14, against the Los Angeles Chargers, he threw a 39-yard touchdown reception to Calvin Ridley in the 20–17 loss. Gage ended the season with career bests in receptions, yards, and touchdowns.

The 2021 season was highlighted by 11 receptions for 130 yards in a 17–30 loss to the Tampa Bay Buccaneers in Week 13, and catching 9 of 13 targets for 126 yards and a touchdown in a Week 18 loss to New Orleans. The touchdown was both Gage's and quarterback Matt Ryan's last touchdowns as Atlanta Falcons. Gage missed two games due to injuries, but still was the Falcons' second leading receiver, behind rookie pro-bowler Kyle Pitts.

Tampa Bay Buccaneers
On March 18, 2022, Gage signed a three year, $30 million contract with the Tampa Bay Buccaneers. Gage spent five weeks on injured reserve. He had a career-best 12 receptions (for 87 yards and a touchdown) in a Week 3 loss to the Green Bay Packers. He had his first career multi-touchdown game in a Week 14 loss to the Cincinnati Bengals. On January 16, 2023, Gage suffered a neck injury during a Wild Card round playoff game against the Dallas Cowboys and was carted off the field. It was confirmed after the game by Todd Bowles that Gage had suffered a concussion from the contact and was being evaluated in a local hospital. The following morning, it was confirmed by the team that Gage "had movement in all extremities" and would remain hospitalized with more testing planned. By Tuesday afternoon, it was reported by Bowles that Gage was planned to be released from the hospital by the end of the day.

NFL career statistics

References

External links

Atlanta Falcons bio
LSU Tigers bio

1996 births
Living people
American football wide receivers
Atlanta Falcons players
LSU Tigers football players
Players of American football from Baton Rouge, Louisiana
Tampa Bay Buccaneers players